Amathusia binghami is a butterfly found in  Peninsular Malaya and  Sumatra It belongs to the Satyrinae, a subfamily of the brush-footed butterflies.

Description

Described as a variety of Amathusia phidippus from which it differs in the following minor respects. The upper hindwing has a concealed hair pencil (scent pencil-a dorsal glandular fold or oval shaped depression on the wing membrane covered by pencils of long hairs) in space 1b and a large buff  hair pencil in 1b. The underside median band is reddish.

References

Amathusia (butterfly)
Butterflies described in 1904